Ménétréol-sous-Sancerre (literally Ménétréol under Sancerre) is a commune in the Cher department in the Centre-Val de Loire region of France.

Geography
The Sauvignon blanc grapes grown here are used for Sancerre AOC wines.

Population

Sights
 The church of St. Hilaire, dating from the seventeenth century.
 The restored watermill.
 The twelfth-century chateau des Aubelles and its chapel.
 The small port on the canal.
 The nineteenth-century railway viaduct.

See also
Communes of the Cher department

References

External links

Maps and photographs of the commune 

Communes of Cher (department)